Noby Marcose is an Indian film and television actor, and comedian, who predominantly works on Malayalam Film Industry. He is well known for his character in Pulimurugan with Mohanlal and in Madhuraraja with Mammooty.He is from Trivandrum. He became popular from Comedy Stars, Asianet. Later he is known for his spot counters in Star Magic, Flowers TV. Noby was one of the finalists of Bigg Boss Malayalam Season 3 (2021)

Biography 

Noby Marcose (born 21 October 1985) is an Indian actor and comedian, who works in Malayalam films, television and stage. Beginning his career as a comedian on stage, he attained recognition after appearing in the TV reality show Comedy Stars on Asianet, where his team emerged as the winner. Noby is also a part of the Star Magic Show in Flowers Channel where he gained much attention. He made his film debut in 2010 with College Days. His other notable films are Maalgudi Days(2016), Pulimurugan(2016), Madhura Raja (2019). He is currently participating in Third season of the Malayalam reality TV series Bigg Boss.

Television

Noby participated in BIGG BOSS MALAYALAM Season 3 (2021), Asianet and was one of the finalist. He is known for his spontaneous counters in Star Magic, Flowers TV and Comedy Stars, Asianet.

Family 
Noby was brought up in Thiruvananthapuram, Kerala. He completed his primary education at G. V. H. S. S., Pirappancode. He is married to law student Arya since 3 February 2014 and they have one son, Dhyan born in 2016.

Career
He began his career on stage shows as a comedian, he worked with several ensemble groups performing comedy skits. He was paid 25 for his first show. Noby attained recognition after appearing in the TV reality show Comedy Stars on Asianet, his team emerged as the winners in the show. He is well known for his character in Pulimurugan with Mohanlal.He is from Trivandrum. He became popular from Comedy Stars, Asianet. Later he is known for his spot counters in Star Magic, Flowers TV. Currently, he is one of the contestants participating in the third season of Bigg Boss Malayalam 2021.

Filmography

Films

Television

Online

References

External links 
 
 

Living people
1983 births
Bigg Boss Malayalam contestants